This page covers all relevant details regarding PFC Cherno More Varna for all official competitions inside the 2009–10 season. These are A PFG, Bulgarian Cup and Europa League.

Events
 15 June: Forward Zdravko Lazarov agrees to join Cherno More from CSKA Sofia
 16 June: Midfielder Stanislav Stoyanov agrees to extend for one year his contract with Cherno More
 10 July: Defender Ademar Junior agrees to join Cherno More from ABC
 28 July: Defender Elidiano Marques agrees to join Cherno More from CSKA Sofia
 14 August: Midfielder Martin Kerchev agrees to join Cherno More from Slavia Sofia

2009–10 Squad
As of 2 May 2010

|-
|colspan="14"|Players sold or loaned out after the start of the season:

|}

Players in / out
In:

Out:

Kit

|
|

Goalscorers

Long-term injury list
{| border="0" width="100%"
|-
|bgcolor="#FFFFFF" valign="top" align="left" width="100%"|

Last updated: 2010-05-16
Source: chernomorepfc.bg

Competitions

Overall

A PFG

League table

Results summary

League performance

Matches

Competitive

Last updated May 16, 2010

Friendlies

See also
PFC Cherno More Varna
2007–08 PFC Cherno More Varna season
2008–09 PFC Cherno More Varna season

References

PFC Cherno More Varna seasons
Cherno More Varna